Marais Croche is an unincorporated community in St. Charles County, in the U.S. state of Missouri.

The name of the community derives from the French meaning crooked lake, and originally was applied to a swamp near the original town site.

References

Unincorporated communities in St. Charles County, Missouri
Unincorporated communities in Missouri